Awasthi is a Brahmin surname. Notable people who bear it 
include:
Dharani Dhar Awasthi (1922–2011), Indian botanist and lichenologist
Malini Awasthi (b. 1967), an Indian folk singer
Prashant Awasthi (cricketer) (b. 1990), an Indian first-class cricketer
Prithvi Raj Abasthi, Nepalese politician
Sapna Awasthi, a playback singer
Tanesha Awasthi (b. 1981), a fashion blogger
Pankhuri Awasthy (b. 1991), an Indian actress

Deepak Awasthi (b. 1992), an Indian man
 

Ethnic groups in Nepal
Bahun
Nepali-language surnames
Khas surnames